Hallines is a commune in the Pas-de-Calais department in the Hauts-de-France region of France.

Geography
A village situated 4 miles (6 km) south of Saint-Omer, on the D211 road, just a few yards from the A26 autoroute.

Population

Places of interest
 The church of St.Martin, rebuilt in the 19th century.
 The château, dating from the nineteenth century.

See also
Communes of the Pas-de-Calais department

References

External links

 Statistical data, INSEE

Communes of Pas-de-Calais